Bithynia (Koine Greek: , Bithynía) was an ancient region, kingdom and Roman province in the northwest of Asia Minor (present-day Turkey), adjoining the Sea of Marmara, the Bosporus, and the Black Sea. It bordered Mysia to the southwest, Paphlagonia to the northeast along the Pontic coast, and Phrygia to the southeast towards the interior of Asia Minor.

Bithynia was an independent kingdom from the 4th century BC. Its capital Nicomedia was rebuilt on the site of ancient Astacus in 264 BC by Nicomedes I of Bithynia. Bithynia was bequeathed to the Roman Republic in 74 BC, and became united with the Pontus region as the province of Bithynia et Pontus. In the 7th century it was incorporated into the Byzantine Opsikion theme.
It became a border region to the Seljuk Empire in the 13th century, and was eventually conquered by the Ottoman Turks between 1325 and 1333.

Description
Several major cities sat on the fertile shores of the Propontis (which is now known as Sea of Marmara): Nicomedia, Chalcedon, Cius and Apamea. Bithynia also contained Nicaea, noted for being the birthplace of the Nicene Creed.

According to Strabo, Bithynia was bounded on the east by the river Sangarius (modern Sakarya river), but the more commonly received division extended it to the Parthenius, which separated it from Paphlagonia, thus comprising the district inhabited by the Mariandyni. On the west and southwest it was separated from Mysia by the river Rhyndacus and on the south it adjoined Phrygia and Galatia.

It is occupied by mountains and forests, but has valleys and coastal districts of great fertility. The most important mountain range is the (so-called) "Mysian" Olympus, which towers above Bursa and is clearly visible as far away as Istanbul. Its summits are covered with snow for a great part of the year.

Both of these ranges are part of the border of mountains which bound the great tableland of Anatolia, Turkey. The broad tract which projects towards the west as far as the shores of the Bosporus, though hilly and covered with forests — the Turkish Ağaç Denizi, or "The sea of Trees" — is not traversed by any mountain chain. At its extremity is situated the small town of Gemlik (ancient Cius) at the mouth of a valley, communicating with the lake of Iznik, on which was situated Nicaea.

The Parthenius (modern Bartın), the eastern boundary of the province, is a much less considerable stream.

The valleys towards the Black Sea abound in fruit trees of all kinds, such as oranges, while the valley of the Sangarius and the plains near Bursa and Iznik (Nicaea) are fertile and well cultivated. Extensive plantations of mulberry trees supply the silk for which Bursa has long been celebrated, and which is manufactured there on a large scale.

History

Iron Age
Bithynia is named for the Thracian tribe of the Bithyni, mentioned by Herodotus (VII.75) alongside the Thyni. The "Thraco-Phrygian" migration from the Balkans to Asia Minor would have taken place at some point following the Bronze Age collapse or during the early Iron Age. The Thyni and Bithyni appear to have settled simultaneously in the adjoining parts of Asia, where they expelled or subdued the Mysians, Caucones and other minor tribes, the Mariandyni maintaining themselves in the northeast. Herodotus mentions the Thyni and Bithyni as settling side by side.  No trace of their original language has been preserved, but Herodotus describes them as related to the tribes of Thracian extraction like the   Phrygians and Armenians, whose languages may form part of the Paleo-Balkan group (although this is not certain and the theory is not universally accepted).

The Bithynians were incorporated by king Croesus within the Lydian monarchy, with which they fell under the dominion of Persia (546 BC), and were included in the satrapy of Phrygia, which comprised all the countries up to the Hellespont and Bosporus.

Kingdom of Bithynia

Even before the conquest by Alexander the Bithynians appear to have asserted their independence, and successfully maintained it under two native princes, Bas and Zipoites, the latter of whom assumed the title of king (basileus) in 297 BC.

His son and successor, Nicomedes I, founded Nicomedia, which soon rose to great prosperity, and during his long reign ( BC), as well as those of his successors, Prusias I, Prusias II and Nicomedes II (14991 BC), the kingdom of Bithynia had a considerable standing and influence among the minor monarchies of Anatolia. But the last king, Nicomedes IV, was unable to maintain himself in power against Mithridates VI of Pontus. After being restored to his throne by the Roman Senate, he bequeathed his kingdom through his will to the Roman republic (74 BC).

The coinage of these kings show their regal portraits, which tend to be engraved in an extremely accomplished Hellenistic style.

Roman province

As a Roman province, the boundaries of Bithynia changed frequently. During this period, Bithynia was commonly united for administrative purposes with the province of Pontus. This was the situation at the time of Emperor Trajan, when Pliny the Younger was appointed governor of the combined provinces (109/110111/112), a circumstance which has provided historians with valuable information concerning the Roman provincial administration at that time.

Byzantine province 

Under the Byzantine Empire, Bithynia was again divided into two provinces, separated by the Sangarius. Only the area to the west of the river retained the name of Bithynia.

Bithynia attracted much attention because of its roads and its strategic position between the frontiers of the Danube in the north and the Euphrates in the south-east. To secure communications with the eastern provinces, the monumental bridge across the river Sangarius was constructed around 562 AD. Troops frequently wintered at Nicomedia.

During this time, the most important cities in Bithynia were Nicomedia, founded by Nicomedes, and Nicaea. The two had a long rivalry with each other over which city held the rank of capital.

Notable people 
Hipparchus of Nicaea (2nd century BC), Greek astronomer, discovered precession and discovered how to predict the timing of eclipses
Theodosius of Bithynia (2nd century BC), Greek astronomer and mathematician
Asclepiades of Bithynia  (c. 169 BC – c. 100 BC), Greek physician
Antinous (2nd century), Catamite of the Roman Emperor Hadrian
Cassius Dio (c. 155 - c. 235), Roman historian, senator, and consul
Arrian (Lucius Flavius Arrianus), Greek historian, c. 86-160
Helena, mother of Constantine the Great 
Phrynichus Arabius (2nd century), grammarian
Auxentius of Bithynia (c. 400 - 473), hermit
Hypatius of Bithynia (died c. 450), hermit
Vendemianus of Bithynia (6th century), hermit

See also
Bithynian coinage
Asia Minor Slavs
Ancient regions of Anatolia

References

Further reading 
Hellenistic
 

Roman

 

 
Historical regions of Anatolia
Praetorian prefecture of the East
Provinces of the Byzantine Empire
History of Bursa Province
History of Kocaeli Province
History of Sakarya Province
History of Bilecik Province
History of Düzce Province
History of Yalova Province
History of Bolu Province
History of Kastamonu Province
History of Bartın Province
History of Zonguldak Province
States and territories established in the 3rd century BC
297 BC
290s BC establishments
States and territories disestablished in the 1st century BC